Jiangnan Yeshi (江南野史; "Wild History of Jiangnan") was a book written by scholar Long Gun during imperial China's Northern Song Dynasty (960–1126) on the history of Southern Tang (937–976), a regime in the Five Dynasties and Ten Kingdoms period. Most likely of 20 chapters originally, only 10 are extant. Praised for its linguistic mastery, it was later included in the Siku Quanshu.

References
 

Chinese history texts
Song dynasty literature
Southern Tang
10th-century Chinese books